Wahlheim is an Ortsgemeinde – a municipality belonging to a Verbandsgemeinde, a kind of collective municipality – in the Alzey-Worms district in Rhineland-Palatinate, Germany.

Geography

Location 
The municipality lies in Rhenish Hesse and belongs to the Verbandsgemeinde of Alzey-Land, whose seat is in Alzey.

Flowing through Wahlheim is the river Aufspringbach, known farther downstream as the river Weidas. Wahlheim is the centre of the kühler Grund (“Cool Ground”).

Neighbouring municipalities 
Wahlheim's neighbours are Esselborn, Freimersheim and Kettenheim.

History 
The village of Wahlheim in the Kettenheimer Grund, once known as Walaheim, belonged to Castle Alzey. In 1400, Count Palatine Ruprecht III bought two parts of the village and municipal area from the Burgmann Heinrich Bock von Lonsheim. From 1633 the village belonged to the Electorate of the Palatinate. In the municipal area was found an estate of the Waida Monastery near Dautenheim. The 20-piped fountain, called the Brückenbrunnen, that once stood between the two constituent communities was removed.

Politics

Municipal council 
The council is made up of 12 council members, who were elected by majority vote at the municipal election held on 7 June 2009, and the honorary mayor as chairman.

Coat of arms 
The German blazon reads thus: In Silber auf grünem Dreiberg zwei grüne Ähren schrägrechts und -links gelegt, bewinkelt von drei roten Mohnkapseln.

The municipality's arms might in English heraldic language be described thus: Argent, in base a mount of three vert issuant from the top of which two ears of wheat, one bendwise, the other bendwise sinister of the same, between three poppy bolls palewise slipped gules, one and two.

These arms appear on the municipality's own website. Heraldry of the World, however, shows slightly different arms, with the same charges, but with the ears’ and bolls’ tinctures transposed.

Economy and infrastructure

Winemaking 
Schelmen, part of the Großlage (winemaking appellation) of Sybillenstein, has  of vineyards.

References

External links 
Wahlheim in the collective municipality’s Web pages 
Municipality’s official webpage 

Alzey-Worms